The GM Standard double-decker bus was a double-decker bus bodywork designed by SELNEC and its successor the Greater Manchester Passenger Transport Executive and built on Leyland Atlantean and Daimler Fleetline chassis. No fewer than 1,815 standards were delivered to SELNEC, Greater Manchester Transport and Lancashire United Transport.

A common design is that the bus has its tall lower deck double-curvature windscreen and upper deck double-curvature windscreen with either an arched top or a flat top.

See also 

 List of buses

External links

Museum of Transport, Greater Manchester

Buses of the United Kingdom
Double-decker buses
Step-entrance buses
Bus transport in Greater Manchester
Vehicles introduced in 1972